The Quick Fix is a humorous mystery novel for children by American author Jack D. Ferraiolo. It was published by Harry N. Abrams Inc. (now Abrams Books) on 1 May 2012 and received the Edgar Award for Best Juvenile in 2013.

Plot summary
Junior high detective Matt Stevens, who made his debut in The Big Splash, investigates the blackmailing of the star of the school basketball team.

References

External links

The Quick Fix at Abrams Books

2012 American novels
2012 children's books
American comedy novels
American mystery novels
Children's mystery novels
Edgar Award-winning works
Novels set in high schools and secondary schools
Abrams Books books